Carlisle is a town in Union County, South Carolina, United States. The population was 436 according to the 2010 United States Census.

History
The community was named after Coleman Carlisle, a Methodist minister.

Hillside and Woodland Plantation are listed on the National Register of Historic Places.

Geography
Carlisle is located at  (34.591674, -81.464518).

Demographics

As of the census of 2000, there were 496 people, 189 households, and 127 families residing in the town. The population density was 350.0 people per square mile (134.9/km2). There were 223 housing units at an average density of 157.4 per square mile (60.6/km2). The racial makeup of the town was 7.86% White and 92.14% African American. Hispanic or Latino of any race were 0.40% of the population.

There were 189 households, out of which 27.5% had children under the age of 18 living with them, 38.6% were married couples living together, 22.2% had a female householder with no husband present, and 32.8% were non-families. 30.7% of all households were made up of individuals, and 12.7% had someone living alone who was 65 years of age or older. The average household size was 2.62 and the average family size was 3.33.

In the town, the population was spread out, with 25.6% under the age of 18, 8.1% from 18 to 24, 28.8% from 25 to 44, 24.6% from 45 to 64, and 12.9% who were 65 years of age or older. The median age was 37 years. For every 100 females, there were 85.1 males. For every 100 females age 18 and over, there were 76.6 males.

The median income for a household in the town was $21,875, and the median income for a family was $33,750. Males had a median income of $26,667 versus $16,447 for females. The per capita income for the town was $10,190. About 23.6% of families and 26.8% of the population were below the poverty line, including 36.0% of those under age 18 and 39.0% of those age 65 or over.

External links
Information on the Town of Carlisle from the Union County website

References

Towns in South Carolina
Towns in Union County, South Carolina